San Rafael Petzal is a municipality in the Guatemalan department of Huehuetenango.

Municipalities of the Huehuetenango Department